Nikita Grigoryevich Balakhontsev (born 1 October 2002) is a Russian football player. He plays for FC Tyumen.

Club career
He made his debut in the Russian Football National League for FC Olimp-Dolgoprudny on 23 July 2021 in a game against FC KAMAZ Naberezhnye Chelny.

References

External links
 
 
 Profile by Russian Football National League

2002 births
Sportspeople from Khabarovsk
Living people
Russian footballers
Association football midfielders
FC SKA-Khabarovsk players
FC Khimki players
Russian First League players
Russian Second League players
FC Olimp-Dolgoprudny players
FC Nosta Novotroitsk players
FC Tyumen players